Black History Month is an annual observance originating in the United States, where it is also known as African-American History Month. It has received official recognition from governments in the United States and Canada, and more recently has been observed in Ireland and the United Kingdom. It began as a way of remembering important people and events in the history of the African diaspora. It is celebrated in February in the United States and Canada, while in Ireland and the United Kingdom it is observed in October.

Origin

Negro History Week (1926) 
The precursor to Black History Month was created in 1926 in the United States, when historian Carter G. Woodson and the Association for the Study of Negro Life and History (ASNLH) announced the second week of February to be "Negro History Week". This week was chosen because it coincided with the birthday of Abraham Lincoln on February 12 and that of Frederick Douglass on February 14, both of which Black communities had celebrated since the late 19th century. For example, in January 1897, school teacher Mary Church Terrell persuaded the Washington, D.C. school board to set aside the afternoon of Douglass's birthday as Douglass Day to teach about his life and work in the city's segregated public schools. The thought process behind the week was never recorded, but scholars acknowledge two reasons for its birth: recognition and importance. In 1915, Woodson had participated in the Lincoln Jubilee, a celebration of the 50 years since emancipation from slavery held in Bronzeville, Chicago. The summer-long Jubilee, which drew thousands of attendees from across the county to see exhibitions of heritage and culture, impressed Woodson with the need to draw organized focus to the history of black people. He led the founding of the ASNLH that fall.

Early in the event's history, African-American newspapers lent crucial support. From the event's initial phase, primary emphasis was placed on encouraging the coordinated teaching of the history of Black Americans in the nation's public schools. The first Negro History Week was met with a lukewarm response, gaining the cooperation of the departments of education of the states of North Carolina, Delaware, and West Virginia as well as the city school administrations of Baltimore, New York City, Philadelphia, and Washington, D.C. Despite this limited observance, Woodson regarded the event as "one of the most fortunate steps ever taken by the Association", and plans for an annual repeat of the event continued.

At the time of Negro History Week's launch, Woodson contended that the teaching of Black History was essential to ensure the physical and intellectual survival of Blacks within broader society:

In 1929, The Journal of Negro History noted that, with only two exceptions, officials with the state departments of education of "every state with considerable Negro population" had made the event known to that state's teachers and distributed official literature associated with the event. Churches also played a significant role in the distribution of literature in association with Negro History Week during this initial period, with the mainstream and Black press aiding in the publicity effort.

Throughout the 1930s, Negro History Week countered the growing myth of the South's "lost cause", which argued that enslaved people had been well-treated, that the Civil War was a war of "northern aggression", and that Black people had been better off under slavery. Woodson wrote , "When you control a man's thinking you do not have to worry about his actions, you do not have to tell him not to stand here or go yonder. He will find his 'proper place' and will stay in it."

Negro History Week grew in popularity throughout the following decades, with mayors across the United States endorsing it as a holiday.

Black History Month (1970) 

Black educators and Black United Students at Kent State University first proposed Black History Month in February 1969. The first celebration of Black History Month took place at Kent State a year later, from January 2 to February 28, 1970.

Six years later, Black History Month was being celebrated all across the country in educational institutions, centers of Black culture, and community centers, both great and small, when President Gerald Ford recognized Black History Month in 1976, during the celebration of the United States Bicentennial. He urged Americans to "seize the opportunity to honor the too-often neglected accomplishments of Black Americans in every area of endeavor throughout our history".

Observance by region

United States 

In the Black community, the creation of Black History Month was met with enthusiastic response; it prompted the creation of Black history clubs, an increase in interest among teachers, and interest from progressive whites.

Since its inception, Black History Month has expanded beyond its initial acceptance in educational establishments. Carter Woodson's organization, now known as the Association for the Study of African American Life and History (ASALH), designates a theme each year. For example, "Black Health and Wellness" in 2022 focused on medical scholars, health care providers, and health outcomes. The Wall Street Journal describes Black History Month as "a time when the culture and contributions of African Americans take center stage" in a variety of cultural institutions, including theaters, libraries, and museums.

Black History Month has garnered attention from the U.S. business community. In 2018, Instagram created its first Black History Month program with the help of its Head of Global Music & Youth Culture Communications, SHAVONE. Instagram's Black History Month program featured a series of first-time initiatives, including a #BlackGirlMagic partnership with Spotify and the launch of the #CelebrateBlackCreatives program, which reached more than 19 million followers. In February 2020, many American corporations commemorated Black History Month, including The Coca-Cola Company, Google, Target Corporation, Macy's, United Parcel Service and Under Armour.

On February 18, 2016, 106-year Washington, D.C., resident and school volunteer Virginia McLaurin visited the White House as part of Black History Month. When asked by President Barack Obama why she was there, McLaurin said: "A Black president. A Black wife. And I'm here to celebrate Black history. That's what I'm here for."

United Kingdom 

In the United Kingdom, Black History Month was first celebrated in October 1987 The year of 1987, recognized as the African Jubilee, coincidentally the year of the 150th anniversary of Caribbean emancipation, the centenary of the birth of Marcus Garvey and the 25th anniversary of the Organization of African Unity, an institution dedicated to advancing the progress of African states. Black History Month in the UK was organised through the leadership of Ghanaian analyst Akyaaba Addai-Sebo, who had served as a coordinator of special projects for the Greater London Council (GLC) and created a collaboration to get it underway. The first Black History Month celebration in the UK was held in London on October 1, 1987, when Dr. Maulana Karenga from the US was invited to an event by the Greater London Council about Black people's contributions to history.

Some institutions have faced criticism for supporting Black History Month with images of people from British Asian backgrounds, using the term "black" to refer to political blackness encompassing all people of color.

Germany 
In Berlin in 1990, members of the Black German community began observing Black History Month. These celebrations then spread to other German cities. Programs have included discussions of black Europeans, international African perspectives, the history of civil rights in the U.S., and apartheid in South Africa.

Canada 
In 1995, after a motion by politician Jean Augustine, representing the riding of Etobicoke—Lakeshore in Ontario, Canada's House of Commons officially recognized February as Black History Month and honored Black Canadians. In 2008, Senator Donald Oliver moved to have the Senate officially recognize Black History Month, which was unanimously approved.

Canada defines the festivity as an opportunity to celebrate "the achievements and contributions of Black Canadians and their communities who … have done so much to make Canada a culturally diverse, compassionate, and prosperous country".

Republic of Ireland 
Ireland's Great Hunger Institute, at Quinnipiac University in Connecticut, notes: "Black History Month Ireland was initiated in Cork in 2010. This location seems particularly appropriate as, in the 19th century, the city was a leading center of abolition, and the male and female anti-slavery societies welcomed several black abolitionists to lecture there, including Charles Lenox Remond and Frederick Douglass."

France 
In France, Black History Month was first organized in 2018 in Bordeaux. Since then, there have been celebrations in the of Paris, Le Havre, Guadeloupe, La Rochelle and Bayonne. In 2022 the month was dedicated to Josephine Baker, a dancer and member of the French Resistance during World War II born in the United States.

Africa 
In 2020, Black History Month was celebrated in seven African countries for the first time. Participating countries were Benin, Burkina Faso, Chad, Ivory Coast, Comores, Senegal and Cameroon. The event was initiated by the organisation Africa Mondo founded by Mélina Seymour. From 2021 onwards an African History Month was celebrated in March.

Developments
When first established, Black History Month resulted in some controversy. Those who believed that Black History Month was limited to educational institutions questioned whether it was appropriate to confine the celebration of Black history to one month, as opposed to the integration of Black history into mainstream education for the whole year. Another concern was that, contrary to the original inspiration for Black History Month, which was a desire to redress how American schools failed to represent Black historical figures as anything other than enslaved people or colonial subjects, Black History Month could reduce complex historical figures to overly simplified objects of "hero worship". Other critics refer to the celebration as a form of racism. Actor and director Morgan Freeman and actress Stacey Dash have criticized the concept of declaring only one month as Black History Month. Freeman noted, "I don't want a Black history month. Black history is American history."

Themes 

In the US, a theme for each Black History Month is selected by the ASALH:
 1928: Civilization: A World Achievement
 1929: Possibility of Putting Negro History in the Curriculum
 1930: Significant Achievements of the Negro
 1931: Neglected Aspects of Negro History
 1932: What George Washington Bicentennial Commission Fail to Do
 1933: Ethiopia Meets Error in Truth
 1934: Contribution of the Negro in Poetry, in Painting, in Sculpture and in Science
 1935: The Negro Achievements in Africa
 1936: African Background Outlined
 1937: American Negro History from the Time of Importation from Africa up to the Present Day
 1938: Special Achievements of the Race: Oratory, Drama, Music, Painting, Sculpture, Science and Inventions
 1939: Special Achievements of the Race: Religion, Education, Business, Architecture, Engineering, Innovation, Pioneering
 1940: Negro Labor
 1941: The Career of Frederick Douglass
 1942: The Negro in Democracy
 1943: The Negro in the Modern World
 1944: The Negro and the New Order
 1945: The Negro and Reconversion
 1946: Let us Have Peace
 1947: Democracy Possible only Through Brotherhood
 1948: The Whole Truth and Nothing but the Truth
 1949: The Use of Spirituals in the Classroom
 1950: Outstanding Moments in Negro History
 1951: Eminent Negroes in World Affairs
 1952: Great Negro Educators (Teachers)
 1953: Negro History and Human Relations
 1954: Negro History: A Foundation for Integration
 1955: Negro History: A Contribution to America's Intercultural Life
 1956: Negro History in an Era of Changing Human Relations
 1957: Negro History
 1958: Negro History: A Factor in Nationalism and Internationalism
 1959: Negro History: A Foundation for a Proud America
 1960: Strengthening America Through Education in Negro History and African Culture
 1961: Freedom and Democracy for the Negro after 100 years (1861-1961)
 1962: Negro History and a New Birth of Freedom
 1963: Negro History Evaluates Emancipation (1863-1963)
 1964: Negro History: A Basis for the New Freedom
 1965: Negro History: Freedom's Foundation
 1966: Freedom from Racial Myths and Stereotypes Through Negro History
 1967: Negro History in the Home, School, and the Community
 1968: The Centennial of the Fourteenth Amendment Afro American History Week
 1969: Changing the Afro American Image through History
 1970: 15th Amendment and Black America in the Century (1870-1970)
 1971: African Civilization and Culture: A Worthy Historical Background
 1972: African Art, Music, Literature; a Valuable Cultural Experience
 1973: Biography Illuminates the Black Experience
 1974: Helping America Understand
 1975: Fulfilling America's Promise: Black History Month
 1976: America for All Americans
 1977: Heritage Days: The Black Perspective; the Third Century
 1978: Roots, Achievements and Projections
 1979: History: Torch for the future
 1980: Heritage for America
 1981: Black History: Role Model for Youth
 1982: Afro American Survival
 1983: Afro Americans in the United States
 1984: Afro Americans and Education
 1985: Afro American Family
 1986: Afro American Experience: International Connection
 1987: Afro Americans and the Constitution from Colonial Times to the Present
 1988: Constitutional Status of Afro Americans in the 21st Century
 1989: Afro Americans and Religion
 1990: Seventy-Five Years of Scholarly Excellence: A Homage to Our Forebearers
 1991: Educating America: Black Universities and Colleges, Strengths and Crisis
 1992: African Roots Experience New Worlds, Pre-Columbus to Space Exploration
 1993: Afro-American Scholars: Leaders, Activists and Writers
 1994: Empowering Black Americans
 1995: Reflections on 1895: Douglass, Du Bois & Washington
 1996: Black Women
 1997: African Americans and Civil Rights; a Reprisal
 1998: Black Business
 1999: Legacy of African American Leadership for the Present and the Future
 2000: Heritage and Horizons: The African American Legacy and the Challenges for the 21st Century
 2001: Creating and Defining the African American Community: Family, Church Politics and Culture
 2002: The Color Line Revisited: Is Racism Dead?
 2003: The Souls of Black Folks: Centennial Reflections
 2004: Before Brown, Beyond Boundaries: Commemorating the 50th Anniversary of Brown v. Board of Education
 2005: The Niagara Movement: Black Protest Reborn, 1905-2005
 2006: Celebrating Community: A Tribute to Black Fraternal, Social, and Civil Institutions
 2007: From Slavery to Freedom: Africans in the Americas
 2008: Carter G. Woodson and the Origins of Multiculturalism
 2009: The Quest for Black Citizenship in the Americas
 2010: The History of Black Economic Empowerment
 2011: African Americans and the Civil War
 2012: Black Women in American Culture and History
 2012: President Barack Obama National Black History Month Proclamation
 2013: At the Crossroads of Freedom and Equality: The Emancipation Proclamation and the March on Washington
 2014: Civil Rights in America
 2015: A Century of Black Life, History, and Culture
 2016: Hallowed Grounds: Sites of African American Memories
 2017: The Crisis in Black Education
 2018: African Americans in Times of War
 2019: Black Migrations
 2020: African Americans and the Vote
 2021: The Black Family: Representation, Identity, and Diversity
 2022: Black Health and Wellness
 2023: Black Resistance

See also 
 African-American history
 African-American Heritage Sites
 African-American Music Appreciation Month

Other history months
 Filipino American History Month
 LGBT History Month
 Women's History Month
 Disability History Month
 Dalit History Month

Heritage months
 Arab American Heritage Month
 Gay and Lesbian Pride Month
 Irish-American Heritage Month
 Italian-American Heritage and Culture Month
 Jewish American Heritage Month
 National Hispanic Heritage Month
 National Tibetan American Heritage Month
 Native American Indian Heritage Month
 Polish American Heritage Month
 Puerto Rican Heritage Month
 South Asian Heritage Month
 Asian Pacific American Heritage Month
 Haitian Heritage Month

International
 Afro-Colombian Day
 Black Awareness Day, Brazil

Footnotes

Further reading

External links 

 Library of Congress Black History Month Website
 Official UK Black History Month Website
 Department of Citizenship and Immigration Canada Black History Month website
 Carter Woodson's life is retold in the radio drama "Recorder of History – Dr. Carter G. Woodson", a presentation from Destination Freedom

African-American history
African-American events
Black British history
History of Black people in Canada
February observances
Commemorative months
1976 introductions
Observances in the United States
Month-long observances
Observances in the United Kingdom
October observances